"So Cold" is a song by American rock band Breaking Benjamin. It was released in March 2004 as the lead single from their second album, We Are Not Alone. Despite never having reached the number one spot on the Mainstream Rock chart, "So Cold" holds the record for the most weeks spent in the chart with 62 weeks. The single was certified Platinum by the RIAA on September 15, 2015, just before the band's debut album Saturate was certified Gold. A reimagined version was released on October 31, 2019 in anticipation for their 2020 album, Aurora.

Background and writing
The movie 28 Days Later was an inspiration while Benjamin Burnley was writing the song. 

In 2020, Burnley told Apple Music,

Music video
The music video of "So Cold" was directed by Frank Borin. Its story takes place in the 19th century, judging by the style of clothing, and first shows a preacher standing at the edge of a swamp. The scene then shifts to a group of people walking in a forest. One man can be seen carrying a large stone with the Breaking Benjamin Celtic knot on it. The man, who is being punished for infidelity towards his wife, is shackled to the stone throughout the video and struggles to free himself from it. Towards the end, the group of people arrive at the swamp where the preacher stands. The man carrying the stone walks into the swamp and drowns. His wife appears in a black robe while the woman he cheated with wears a white robe. 

Meanwhile, the band is seen throughout the video in another part of the forest performing the song.

Charts and certifications

Weekly charts

Certifications

So Cold EP

So Cold EP is an EP which was released on November 23, 2004. It was originally going to be titled the So Cold (Acoustic) EP. The EP contains five songs, three were recorded live ("So Cold (live acoustic)", "Away" and "Breakdown") and two were studio recorded material ("Blow Me Away" and "Lady Bug"). Kevin Soffera appears on the tracks "Away" and "Breakdown".

Track listing

References

2004 singles
Breaking Benjamin songs
Hollywood Records singles
2004 songs
Songs written by Benjamin Burnley
Song recordings produced by David Bendeth